The Averitt-Herod House is a historic mansion in Hartsville, Tennessee, U.S.. It was built for Peter Averitt, Sr. in 1834. It has been listed on the National Register of Historic Places since April 12, 1996.

References

Houses on the National Register of Historic Places in Tennessee
Federal architecture in Tennessee
Greek Revival architecture in Tennessee
Houses completed in 1834
Buildings and structures in Trousdale County, Tennessee